A Shirley Temple is a non-alcoholic mixed drink traditionally made with ginger ale and a splash of grenadine, and garnished with a maraschino cherry. Modern Shirley Temple recipes may substitute lemon-lime soda or lemonade and sometimes orange juice, in part or in whole. Shirley Temples are often served as an alternative to alcoholic cocktails, as are the similar Roy Rogers and Arnold Palmer. In some regions of the Midwestern United States, the cocktail is referred to as a Kiddie Cocktail, owing to it often being served to children.

Origin 
The cocktail may have been invented by a bartender at Chasen's, a restaurant in West Hollywood, California, to serve then-child actress Shirley Temple. However, other claims to its origin have been made. Temple herself was not a fan of the drink, as she told Scott Simon in an NPR interview in 1986: "The saccharine sweet, icky drink? Yes, well... those were created in the probably middle 1930s by the Brown Derby Restaurant in Hollywood and I had nothing to do with it. But, all over the world, I am served that. People think it's funny. I hate them. Too sweet!" In 1988, Temple filed a lawsuit to prevent the sale of a bottled soda version using her name.

With alcohol 
Adding 1.5 US fluid ounces (44 ml) of vodka or rum produces a "Dirty Shirley". If dark rum is used, it produces a Shirley Temple Black, an homage to her married surname.

See also
Queen Mary, a beer cocktail with grenadine and maraschino cherries
Roy Rogers, a mixed drink made with cola and maraschino cherries

References 

American drinks
Non-alcoholic mixed drinks
Shirley Temple